Hembra is the second studio album by Líbido, released in 2000.

Track listing

Album credits

Production
Executive Producer: Tweety González

Personnel
Vocals: Salim Vera
Engineered by Pablo Caceres, Doug Trantow and Ricardo Troilo
Production Assistant: Demian Chorovicz
Percussion, Bateria, Coros: Jeffry Fischman
Piano, Keyboards, Programming, Digital Editing: Tweety González
Arranger: Libido and Tweety González
Mastering: Eddy Schreyer
Guitar: Salim Vera

References

Líbido (band) albums
2000 albums